Big Shots is an American comedy-drama television series created and executive produced by Jon Harmon Feldman and aired on ABC from September 27, 2007, to January 24, 2008. The pilot was directed by Charles McDougall.

History
Produced by Warner Bros. Television, the series was officially approved for broadcast and  thirteen episodes were commissioned on May 11, 2007. The show was added to the schedule on Thursday nights at 10:02 p.m. EST (9:02PM CT). It premiered on September 27, 2007, on ABC, following Grey's Anatomy. It also premiered on CTV in Canada on the same date, but was shifted to CTV's secondary A-Channel effective October 25, 2007.

ABC pulled Big Shots from the schedule in December 2007, and filled its slot with repeats of Private Practice. On December 15, 2007, ABC announced its mid-season schedule, and Big Shots was back on the schedule. Despite the original commission of thirteen episodes, as a result of the Writers Guild of America strike in Hollywood, only eleven were made. The final one aired on January 24, 2008. On May 13, 2008, ABC officially cancelled the series.

Plot
The show was officially pitched as "the story of four friends at the top of their game... until the women in their lives enter the room. Lines between boardroom and bedroom blur when these competitive but dysfunctional CEOs take refuge in their friendship, discussing business, confiding secrets, seeking advice and supporting each other through life's surprising twists and turns."

During the show's short run, each character had one or two major plot arcs that generally did not overlap.  The principal characters were tied by their wealthy lifestyles, friendship and regular visits to their men's club, where they commiserated while engaging in leisure activities in the sauna, pool room, golf course and the like. James was promoted to the position of his late boss, but discovered that his wife had had an affair with the man.  The fallout of the divorce, and his romantic relationship with his VP, Katie, were his main plot lines.  Duncan tried to win back his first wife (the mother of his twenty-something daughter).  His efforts were thwarted by personal scandal (sex with a trans woman) and the machinations of his professional and personal rival.  Additionally, a mentally-troubled young man insinuates himself in Duncan's life, claiming to be his son.  Karl takes up a mistress, but quickly ends the relationship.  Ironically, his wife (who knows nothing of the affair) becomes the woman's best friend and she moves in with the couple.  His story lines center on this ironic situation, along with the couple's infertility.  Brody is characterized as hen-pecked at home, and the somewhat put-upon friend of the four.  His connections often help them (especially Duncan) in their times of trouble. His chief actions surround his efforts to procure a higher clientele.

Characters
James Walker (Michael Vartan)Joining Amerimart Industries directly out of Harvard Business School, James has followed in the footsteps of his mentor, and Amerimart's former CEO, Walter Storrs. James previously held various positions within Amerimart, including Director of Business Development, where he led teams in several innovative acquisitions, both domestic and in the E.U.

A native of Lake Forest, Illinois,  James received his B.A. in History, magna cum laude, from the University of Wisconsin-Madison in 1991. James earned his M.B.A. from Harvard Business School in 1993, while simultaneously externing in Amerimart's Boston office.

James and his wife Stacey have two children.

Related characters:  Stacey Walker (ex-wife)

Duncan Collinsworth (Dylan McDermott)Duncan Collinsworth, CEO, brings over twenty years of business experience to Reveal Cosmetics. Duncan got his start in the business world when he was still in high school, selling records to his classmates. Over the years, he moved up the ladder at various companies, running the gamut from the real estate to office supplies, until Duncan found his true calling in the cosmetics industry.

During his tenure, Duncan has transformed Reveal from a local mom and pop company specializing in day creams to a multi-billion dollar enterprise which produces some of the world's most popular cosmetics. After a scandal erupted involving Duncan and a transsexual hooker, he was fired from his job as CEO, but later regained the position.

Related characters: Lisbeth Collinsworth (ex-wife), Cameron (daughter), Zack (imposter son)

Karl Mixworthy (Joshua Malina)Mixworthy was appointed President of Flexor Williams in 2004, after having served as Director of Product Development. Prior to joining the company, Karl brings tremendous knowledge of drug discovery to Flexor Williams. He received his Masters in Business Administration from Harvard Business School while simultaneously completing his M.A. in Molecular Biology from the Massachusetts Institute of Technology. Karl received his B.S. in Microbiology from Johns Hopkins University.  He graduated from Scarsdale High School, where he was admittedly an unpopular student who was regularly bullied.

Mixworthy played a noteworthy role in the development of Flexor Williams' popular drug, Phocustin, which both improves an individual's ability to focus on various matters simultaneously, while alleviating symptoms of stress associated with such 'multi tasking,' as well as treating erectile dysfunction.

Related characters: Wendy (wife); Marla (former mistress)

Brody Johns (Christopher Titus)Brody Johns has long been regarded as one of the country's leading experts in crisis management and effective crisis communications. In 1999, Brody founded Alpha Crisis Management, focusing on the effective handling of crises, in the government, corporate and entertainment arenas.

Brody has successfully counseled several of the country's most respected companies in crisis management, public relations and crisis communications, as well as advising such entities on threats associated with the growing problem of corporate espionage. In addition, Brody is quickly becoming known for his successful track record in effectively dealing with various personal scandals associated with high profile celebrities. Brody's unparalleled ability to remain calm and clear headed in such tabloid ready matters has won him the loyalty of clients around the world.

Mr. Johns received his B.A. from Harvard University in 1989. In one episode he also mentioned that he went to a year of law school.

Related characters: Janelle (wife)

Main crew
Paul Blackthorne   (9 episodes, 2007-2008)
Michael Katleman   (3 episodes, 2007-2008)
Rob Thomas   (3 episodes, 2007-2008)
Brian Burns   (2 episodes, 2007-2008)
Daniel Truly   (2 episodes, 2007-2008)
Jon Harmon Feldman (Head Writer)
Emily Whitesell
Joshua Levey
Susan Edelman
Jason Roberts

Episodes

Reception
Though not universal, early critical response was generally negative.  Referring to Desperate Housewives, Newsweek said "it's not into the toilet, which is where Big Shots spends its time both literally and figuratively." The Los Angeles Times said the show features "a quartet of rich guys so insufferable, self-centered and whiny that they make the men of feminist masterwork 'The Golden Notebook,' or even 'The Nanny Diaries,' look positively heroic." People magazine called the show one of several "Sex and the City clones" and the characters "Entourage-wannabes". Since the show was pitched as a behind-the-scenes look at male bonding pitched to a female target audience, much of the critique focused on the show's failure in that regard.  USA Today said simply "The problem with Big Shots is that the men don't sound like anyone at all, male or female." Critics from The A.V. Club compared the show to AMC's Mad Men, saying that it was "contemporary and no where near as good". In one notably positive review, The New York Times called the show "one of television’s rare examples of successful farce."

U.S. Nielsen ratings
In the following chart, "rating" is the percentage of all households with televisions that tuned to the show, and "share" is the percentage of all televisions in use at that time that are tuned in. "18–49" is the percentage of all adults aged 18–49 tuned into the show. "Viewers" are the number of viewers, in millions, watching at the time.

Unless otherwise cited, the overnight rating and share information come from http://www.zap2it.com/tv/ratings/

Weekly ratings

Seasonal ranking
Based on average total viewers per episode of Big Shots on ABC:

References

External links

Big Shots - Full Episodes Online (Canada only) - A Channel
Watch online bookmarks

2000s American drama television series
2007 American television series debuts
2008 American television series endings
Television series by Warner Bros. Television Studios
American Broadcasting Company original programming
English-language television shows
Television shows set in New York City